Providence Presbyterian Church is a historic Presbyterian church located near Gum Spring, Louisa County, Virginia. It was built in 1747, and is a two-story, three bay, wood-frame building measuring 50 feet, 3 inches, by 26 feet, 4 inches.  It is one of the few frame churches in Virginia remaining from colonial times and was one of the first Presbyterian churches to be built in the central part of the state. Samuel Davies served as its first minister until 1759, when he assumed the presidency of Princeton University.  A distinguished son of the church was Robert Lewis Dabney, noted mid-19th century Presbyterian minister and church architect.

It was listed on the National Register of Historic Places in 1973.

References

Churches on the National Register of Historic Places in Virginia
Presbyterian churches in Virginia
Churches completed in 1747
Churches in Louisa County, Virginia
National Register of Historic Places in Louisa County, Virginia
18th-century Presbyterian church buildings in the United States